Hans Minzloff (1890–1962) was a German art director.

Selected filmography
 Our Heavenly Bodies (1925)
 Struggle for the Soil (1925)
 Carnival Magic (1927)
 The Insurmountable (1928)
 The Circus Princess (1929)
 Youth of the Big City (1929)
 Queen of Fashion (1929)
 Tempo! Tempo! (1929)
 Hungarian Nights (1929)
 Foolish Happiness (1929)
 Gentlemen Among Themselves (1929)
 The Black Domino (1929)
 The Daredevil (1931)
 The Page from the Dalmasse Hotel (1933)
 All Because of the Dog (1935)
 Pillars of Society (1935)
 Maria the Maid (1936)
 Stronger Than Regulations (1936)
 The Glass Ball (1937)
 Elephant Fury (1953)
 Emilia Galotti (1958)

References

Bibliography
 Gerd Gemünden. A Foreign Affair: Billy Wilder's American Films. Berghahn Books, 2008.

External links

1890 births
1962 deaths
German art directors
Film people from Berlin